Liam Higgins (born ) is an English former professional rugby league footballer. He previously played for Hull FC, Castleford Tigers (Heritage № 864), Wakefield Trinity Wildcats and Sheffield Eagles.

International career

Higgins qualifies for Serbia through his Serbian Grandfather. He was called up to the Serbia squad for the first time to compete in the 2013 Rugby League World Cup qualifying tournament.

References

1983 births
Living people
Castleford Tigers players
English people of Serbian descent
English rugby league players
Hull F.C. players
Rugby league props
Serbia national rugby league team players
Sheffield Eagles players
Rugby league players from Doncaster
Wakefield Trinity players